The 2008 Clásica de Almería was the 23rd edition of the Clásica de Almería cycle race and was held on 2 March 2008. The race started in El Ejido and finished in Almería. The race was won by Juan José Haedo.

General classification

References

2008
2008 in road cycling
2008 in Spanish sport